The Royal Naval School Tal Handaq was a school for children of personnel of the British Armed Forces posted to Malta between January 1947 and July 1978. Formerly known as the Naval Children's School and HM Dockyard Children's School, it had occupied sites at Ta'Xbiex, Cottonera, Senglea and the Dockyard before moving to Tal Handaq, a military camp, built during World War 2, to resemble a Maltese village when viewed from the air. Staffed partially by Royal Naval personnel the school was also used by children of personnel of the Military of the United States in the 1950s. When first occupied as a school in 1947 only the buildings in the southern and central area of the present day school had been built. The remaining buildings were constructed in the early to late 1950s, initially with the objective of supporting a complement of some 800 British Forces pupils. The school was co-educational with similar numbers of boys and girls. It was also both a secondary grammar and a secondary modern school until 1963, when it re-formed as a comprehensive. Numbers at the school steadily increased until by 1960 the school held over 1000 pupils. Even so, class size was still not excessive with a typical class size of 25 pupils in 1960.

The Royal Naval School was renamed the Service Children's Comprehensive School in 1969. It closed as a Forces' school in 1978 just before the final withdrawal of British forces from Malta in March 1979.

The school re-opened as a Junior Lyceum in September 1981 under the name of Liceo M. A. Vassalli. In 2006 new building began on completion of which most of the old buildings were demolished.
The new buildings opened in 2008 as Kullegg Sant' Injazju.

Headmasters 
Headmaster J Sullivan Nov 1858 – 
Headmaster W Candey 1918
Headmaster Govier Mar 1925 
Headmaster H E Hindmand MBE Mar 1925 – Jun 1928 
Headmaster G H Rickers Jun 1928 – Dec 1932 
Headmaster Lieut W F Plant Nov 1932 – Dec 1937 
Headmaster Lieut F J Giles Dec 1937 – Sep 1942
Instructor Commander A H Miles OBE (later Instructor Captain, CBE)       May 1946 – Jan 1951 
Instructor Commander A J Bellamy OBE (later Instructor Rear Admiral, CB) Jan 1951 – Apr 1954
Instructor Captain B J Morgan (later Instructor Rear Admiral, CB)        Apr 1954 – Apr 1959
Instructor Captain D E Mannering Apr 1959 – Aug 1963 
Instructor Captain L Broad Aug 1963 – Aug 1966 
Instructor Captain H C Malkin (later CBE)                                Aug 1966 – Jan 1970 
Instructor Commander M F Law (later Captain)                             Jan 1970 – Apr 1974
Commander G D Stubbs Apr 1974 – Jul 1978

Alternative spellings 

The following spellings of Tal-Handaq may be found on present day official documents.

 Tal-Ħandaq (link to related Wikipedia entry)
 Tal-Handaq
 Tal Handaq

The following Anglicised spelling may occasionally be found on internal documents issued during the Royal Naval School period (refer: Etymology section).

 Tal-Handak
 Tal Handak

Etymology

Tal Handak is the British phonetic spelling of the Maltese industrial area Tal Handaq located in the district of Qormi.

It is not uncommon for British people to incorrectly pronounce Maltese words containing the silent Q as if it were an English word. For example, Qormi (pronounced 'Ormi) is sometimes wrongly pronounce "Kwormi" by British people unfamiliar with the written Maltese language. Similarly Tal Handaq (pronounced Tal Handa') was often pronounced Tal HandaK by British Forces personnel.

Between the years 1947 to 1978 the Royal Naval Secondary School for British Forces children was located at Tal Handaq and a number of printed documents relating to the school employed the more comfortable (to the British) spelling of Tal Handak.

Photo gallery

References
 Captain M. F. Law. The History of The Royal Naval School Tal-Handaq. Available to be read on-line at: History of The Royal Naval School Tal-Handaq.

External links
 A website containing more than 450 photos of the school plus many school related photos and videos.
 Tal Handaq Reunion Association
 History as written by former headmaster, Captain M.F. Law
Tal Handaq Nostalgia. Photographic memories of the school.1947 – 1978.
 School Magazines. On line collection at Tal Handaq Magazines.

Defunct schools in Malta
Educational institutions established in 1947
1947 establishments in Malta
Service Children's Education
Qormi
1978 disestablishments in Malta
Educational institutions disestablished in 1978